Henry Ford's Restaurant was a restaurant in Portland, Oregon.

History 
The business operated from the 1970s to 2003.

Reception 
Erin DeJesus included Henry Ford's in Eater Portland's 2013 list of Portland's 19 most missed restaurants. She said the piano bar "is missed for its old-school steakhouse vibe". Dillon Pilorget included the restaurant in The Oregonian's 2016 list of "Lost landmarks: 30 Portland places you won't see again", writing: "The decidedly lounge-like restaurant employed a level of classy kitsch perfect for prom dates or an evening out with friends. The condos that went up after the restaurant closed in 2003 don't quite give the same vibe that the restaurant's bubble fountain and other quirky trimmings did for decades." The newspaper's Grant Butler included Henry Ford's in a 2016 list of "Tasty memories: 97 long-gone Portland restaurants we wish were still around". He wrote:

References 

1970s establishments in Oregon
2003 disestablishments in Oregon
Defunct restaurants in Portland, Oregon
Restaurants disestablished in 2003
Southwest Portland, Oregon